Philip John Waller (born 1946) is an English historian and emeritus fellow of Merton College, University of Oxford. He is the author of a number of academic texts.

Biography
Philip Waller was born in 1946, and studied history at Magdalen College, Oxford.
He enjoyed a long career at Merton College, Oxford, where he was Tutor in Modern History from 1971 to 2008.

He also served as Senior Tutor and Sub-Warden of Merton, and held visiting professorships at the University of South Carolina, Columbia, in 1979 and Colorado College, Colorado Springs, in 1985.

Waller is the author of a number of academic texts, including Democracy and Sectarianism: A Political and Social History of Liverpool, 1868–1939, published in 1981, and Town, City, and Nation: England 1850–1914, published by Oxford University Press in 2006.

He has published many essays and articles in a variety of academic journals, magazines and symposia, and in 2003 he served as editor of The English Historical Review.

While at Merton, Waller led history reading parties in Cornwall, a tradition begun by his predecessor Roger Highfield in 1953. Even in retirement Waller continued to invite undergraduate historians to visit his home on Bodmin Moor.

Selected publications
 Democracy and Sectarianism: A Political and Social History of Liverpool, 1868–1939, 1981
 Politics and Social Change in Modern Britain, Harvester, 1987
 The Chronology of the Modern World, Helicon, 1994
 Chronology of the 20th Century, Helicon, 1995
 The English Urban Landscape, Oxford University Press, March 2000
 Town, City, and Nation: England 1850–1914, Oxford University Press, 2006
 Writers, Readers, and Reputations: Literary Life in Britain 1870–1918, 15 May 2008
 A Dictionary of British and Irish History, with Robert Peberdy, 24 September 2020

See also
Roger Highfield
John Roberts

References

External links
"Philip John Waller – Emeritus Fellow", Merton College, Oxford.

Living people
English historians
Fellows of Merton College, Oxford
1946 births
Alumni of Magdalen College, Oxford
University of South Carolina faculty
Colorado College faculty